Hans Bonte (born 20 January 1962 in Kortrijk) is a Belgian politician and has been a federal representative since 1995 (for the constituency of Brussels-Halle-Vilvoorde). He is a member of Vooruit (formerly SP.A), the Flemish social-democratic party.

He holds a degree in Sociology and Political Science from the University of Ghent (UGent) and the Free University of Brussels (VUB).

Career
1995–present: Member of the Federal Chamber of Representatives
2001–2012: Schepen in Vilvoorde
2013–present: Mayor of Vilvoorde

References

1962 births
Living people
People from Kortrijk
Members of the Belgian Federal Parliament
21st-century Belgian politicians